Cross Telecom  (founded in 1996) is located in Bloomington, Minnesota. Cross is a company produces a range of products and services relating to the telecommunications industry that include: VOIP, networking, unified communications, Avaya maintenance & support, and professional services. Cross is an Avaya National Platinum Business Partner, Avaya Platinum DevConnect Business Partner, Cisco Silver Certified Partner, and Extreme Networks Diamond Partner.  Cross' partnership with Extreme Networks provides communication and network solutions. Cross is also a member of the Avaya Services Delivery Specialisation (SDS) program. The SDS program gives Cross access to provide services in implementation, maintenance support and application integration. Cross Telecom provides services across verticals such as: federal government, health care and education.

Cross University
Cross University is located in a  facility in Bloomington, Minnesota. Cross University has such programs as: Cross Briefing, Training and Demo Center, equipped with communications technology.

References

Telecommunications companies of the United States
Companies based in Bloomington, Minnesota